Kitt Peak is a mountain in the U.S. state of Arizona, and at  is the highest point in the Quinlan Mountains. It is the location of the Kitt Peak National Observatory. The radio telescope at the observatory is one of ten dishes comprising the Very Long Baseline Array radio telescope.

The peak was named in English by county surveyor George J. Roskruge for his sister, Phillippa, who was the wife of William F. Kitt. On his 1893 Pima County Survey map, Roskruge spelled the name 'Kits'. At the request of the wife of George F. Kitt, the spelling was changed by decision in 1930.

Kitt Peak is the second-highest peak on the Tohono O'odham Indian Reservation, and as such is the second-most sacred after Baboquivari Peak.  Near the summit is I'itoi's Garden, the summer residence of the nation's elder brother deity.  The name Ioligam means "red stick" in reference to the abundance of manzanita bushes on and around the mountain.

References

Landforms of Pima County, Arizona
Mountains of Arizona
Religious places of the indigenous peoples of North America
Sacred mountains
Sonoran Desert
Tohono O'odham Nation
Mountains of Pima County, Arizona
North American 2000 m summits